Stuart Wood (born 31 January 1994) is a British paracanoeist. He represented Great Britain at the 2020 Summer Paralympics.

Early life and education
Stuart is a graduate from the University of Bath, where he studied maths, physics and computer science, and he now works in software development in Nottingham. Stuart has been a keen paddler for a number of years and having originally started in the KL3; he has very much found his form in the VL3.

Career
In June 2021 it was announced that Stuart had been selected as part of the paracanoe team for his debut Paralympic Games.

Wood represented Great Britain at the 2019 ICF Canoe Sprint World Championships in the men's VL3 event and won a bronze medal. He was subsequently named to the Paralympic team for Great Britain.

Wood represented Great Britain at the 2020 Summer Paralympics in the men's VL3 event and won a bronze medal.

References

1994 births
Living people
British male canoeists
Paracanoeists at the 2020 Summer Paralympics
Medalists at the 2020 Summer Paralympics
Paralympic medalists in paracanoe
Paralympic bronze medalists for Great Britain
ICF Canoe Sprint World Championships medalists in paracanoe